Sefton may refer to:

Places
 Sefton, Merseyside, a village in Merseyside, England
 Metropolitan Borough of Sefton, a metropolitan borough of Merseyside, England
 Sefton, New South Wales, a suburb of Sydney, Australia
 Sefton, New Zealand, a small settlement in New Zealand
 Sefton, a  housing estate in Dún Laoghaire Borough, in County Dublin, Ireland
 Mount Sefton, a mountain close to Mount Cook in New Zealand's Southern Alps

People

Given name 
 Sefton Brancker (1877–1930), Air Vice Marshal
 Sefton Delmer (1904–1979), journalist

Surname 
 Allan Roy Sefton (1921–1989), Australian ornithologist and environmentalist
 Amanda Sefton, Marvel Comics character
 Ann Elizabeth Sefton (born 1936), Australian neurologist and educator
 Clyde Sefton (born 1951), cyclist
 Fred Sefton (1888–1976), basketball coach

Other
 Sefton Coast, Site of special scientific interest
 Sefton (army horse), a horse (survivor of a terrorist bombing in 1982)
 Sefton (racehorse), winner of the 1878 Epsom Derby
 Sefton Metropolitan Borough Council, the governing body of the borough
 Earl of Sefton, part of the Peerage of Ireland
Sefton, a cultivar of Agrostis capillaris (Common Bentgrass) developed in New Zealand

See also
 7552 Sephton, an asteroid